Frederikshavn railway station (Danish: Frederikshavn Station or Frederikshavn Banegård) is a railway station serving the town of Frederikshavn in Vendsyssel, Denmark. It is located in central Frederikshavn, situated between the town centre and the Port of Frederikshavn, and immediately adjacent to the Frederikshavn bus station.

The station is the terminus of the Vendsyssel railway line from Aalborg to Frederikshavn as well as the Skagen railway line from Frederikshavn to Skagen. The station opened in 1871 and was moved to its current location in 1979. It offers direct regional rail services to Aalborg as well as local train services to Skagen. The train services are currently operated by the local railway company Nordjyske Jernbaner.

History 

The first station in Frederikshavn opened on 15 August 1871 as the terminal station of the new Vendsyssel railway line from Nørresundby to Frederikshavn. On 7 January 1879, at the opening of the Limfjord Railway Bridge which connected Nørresundby and Aalborg across the Limfjord, the line was connected with Aalborg station, the Randers–Aalborg railway line and the rest of Denmark's railway lines.

The original station was designed by N.P.C. Holsøe. It was located a short distance west of the current station, in the area where Frederikshavn Town Hall is now located.

The station became the southern terminus of the Skagen railway line between Frederikshavn og Skagen in 1890. In 1899 it also became the northern terminus of the Sæby railway line between Nørresundby and Frederikshavn, via Sæby, until the section between Sæby and Frederikshavn was closed in 1962.

In 1979, the station moved to its current location, and the old station was closed and demolished.

In 2017, operation of the regional rail services on the Vendsyssel railway line between Aalborg and Frederikshavn were transferred from DSB to the local railway company Nordjyske Jernbaner.

Facilities 
Inside the station building there is a combined ticket office and convenience store operated by 7-Eleven, waiting room, toilets and lockers.

Adjacent to the station is the Frederikshavn bus terminal.

Train services
The station offers direct regional rail services to Aalborg,  as well as local train services to Skagen operated by the railway company Nordjyske Jernbaner.

An international passenger service, Nordpilen, between Frederikshavn and Hamburg, connecting with the ferries to and from Sweden and Norway, ceased many years ago.

See also
 List of railway stations in Denmark

References

Bibliography

See also
 Banedanmark
 Danish State Railways
 Nordjyske Jernbaner
 Transportation in Denmark
 Rail transport in Denmark

External links

 Banedanmark – government agency responsible for maintenance and traffic control of most of the Danish railway network
 Nordjyske Jernbaner – Danish railway company operating in North Jutland Region
 Danske Jernbaner – website with information on railway history in Denmark
 Nordjyllands Jernbaner – website with information on railway history in North Jutland

Frederikshavn
Railway stations in the North Jutland Region
Railway stations opened in 1871
Railway stations opened in 1979
Buildings and structures in Frederikshavn Municipality
Railway stations in Denmark opened in the 20th century